Nikolay Germanovich Nogovitsyn (born 7 January 1948 in Prokopievsk) is a former Soviet Nordic combined skier who competed during the 1970s. He won a silver medal in the individual event at the 1970 FIS Nordic World Ski Championships in Vysoké Tatry.

Nogovitsyn also finished 6th in the individual event at the 1976 Winter Olympics in Innsbruck.

External links

Olympic Nordic combined skiers of the Soviet Union
Soviet male Nordic combined skiers
Nordic combined skiers at the 1976 Winter Olympics
1948 births
Living people
FIS Nordic World Ski Championships medalists in Nordic combined
Universiade medalists in nordic combined
Universiade gold medalists for the Soviet Union
Competitors at the 1970 Winter Universiade